Sir Thomas Matthews (8 August 1849 – 13 January 1930) was a British civil engineer, who was a notable builder of lighthouses. He was the brother of Sir William Matthews, also a prominent civil engineer. During the late 19th and early 20th century Thomas Matthews was the Engineer-in-Chief of Trinity House.

Biography

Thomas Matthews was born in Penzance, Cornwall, where he was the son of the Borough Surveyor, John Matthews. From 1868 to 1871 he assisted his father in providing drinking water for Penzance and the sea and harbour defences. For the following two years he practised as an architect and surveyor in Penzance and in 1874, he entered the employment of the United Kingdom's lighthouse service, Trinity House, as an assistant engineer. He succeeded Sir James Nicholas Douglass as Engineer-in-Chief when the latter retired in 1892.

Matthews went on to design over a dozen lighthouses for Trinity House. He also worked on illumination systems, notably a lamp designed to burn oil vapour. Matthews' most significant achievement was the construction of Beachy Head Lighthouse. Completed in 1902, it was the last rock lighthouse built by Trinity House. The work took two years to finish; it involved building a coffer-dam and an aerial ropeway from the cliffs to transport materials.

Lighthouses designed by Matthews
These included:
Bamburgh Lighthouse
Beachy Head Lighthouse
Berry Head Lighthouse
Black Nore Lighthouse
Cape Pembroke Lighthouse
Dungeness Lighthouses (High and Low)
East Usk Lighthouse
Egypt Point Lighthouse
Lundy Lighthouses (North and South)
Lynmouth Foreland Lighthouse
St Mary's Lighthouse
Spurn Head Lighthouse
Strumble Head Lighthouse
Pendeen Lighthouse
Peninnis Lighthouse
Portland Bill Lighthouse
Withernsea Lighthouse

References

External links
 Lighthouses built by Sir Thomas Matthews

1849 births
1930 deaths
British civil engineers
Engineers from Cornwall
Lighthouse builders
Knights Bachelor
People from Penzance